North Buffalo may refer to:

North Buffalo Township, Pennsylvania, a township in Pennsylvania
North Buffalo, Buffalo, a neighbourhood in Buffalo, New York